Diane De Courcy is a Canadian politician. She was a Parti Québécois member of the National Assembly of Quebec for the riding of Crémazie from 2012 to 2014, first elected in the 2012 election.

Prior to entering the National Assembly, De Courcy was funding President of the Commission scolaire de Montreal for the Mouvement pour une école moderne et ouverte.

Following the 2012 election, De Courcy immediately entered Cabinet as Minister of Immigration and Cultural Communities and, most importantly, Minister Responsible for the Charter of the French Language. In this capacity, she has been a central figure in the debate surrounding Bill 14, a proposed piece of legislation that would amend the Charter of the French Language (Bill 101).

De Courcy was defeated in the 2014 election, which saw the PQ reduced to 30 seats across the province and hold on to only 4 seats on the Island of Montreal. One possible reason for De Courcy's defeat in Crémazie was the backlash to the Quebec Charter of Values, which was highly unpopular among the large immigrant population in the riding.

References

Living people
Parti Québécois MNAs
Women MNAs in Quebec
Politicians from Montreal
21st-century Canadian politicians
21st-century Canadian women politicians
Year of birth missing (living people)